Koiak 17 - Coptic Calendar - Koiak 19

The eighteenth day of the Coptic month of Koiak, the fourth month of the Coptic year. On a common year, this day corresponds to December 14, of the Julian Calendar, and December 27, of the Gregorian Calendar. This day falls in the Coptic season of Peret, the season of emergence. This day falls in the Nativity Fast.

Commemorations

Saints 

 The martyrdom of Saint Heracles and Saint Philemon the Priest

Other commemorations 

 The relocation of the relics of Saint Titus to Constantinople

References 

Days of the Coptic calendar